Every Man for Himself may refer to:
 Every Man for Himself (novel), a novel by Beryl Bainbridge
 Every Man for Himself (1924 film), an Our Gang short film
 The Enigma of Kaspar Hauser, 1974 German film; German title translates as "Every Man for Himself and God Against All"
 Every Man for Himself (1980 film) or Sauve qui peut (la vie), a film by Jean-Luc Godard
 "Every Man for Himself" (Lost), an episode of Lost
 Every Man for Himself (album), an album by Hoobastank
 "Every Man for Himself" (song), a song by Neal McCoy from the album 24-7-365
 "Every Man for Himself", a song by Big Black

See also
 Devil Take the Hindmost (disambiguation)